Christine Margaret Shrimpton (born 15 July 1945) is an English former 1960s model and actress.

Personal life
Shrimpton is model Jean Shrimpton's younger sister and was the girlfriend of the Rolling Stones frontman Mick Jagger from 1963 to 1966. According to the Stones biographer Stephen Davis, their 1966 album Aftermath was a source of embarrassment for Shrimpton, since "people generally identified her with the [album's] scathing put-downs", and that it led to an argument she and Jagger had while attending a party hosted by Guinness heir Tara Browne in April 1966.

In popular culture
In the BBC Four biographical film We'll Take Manhattan (2012), about her sister Jean and photographer David Bailey's affair in New York City, Shrimpton is played by Clemmie Dugdale. It's thought that the Small Faces song "Talk to You" is about her.

Films
G.G. Passion (1966) as G.G.'s main girlfriend
Moon Zero Two (1969) as Boutique Attendant
My Lover My Son (1970) as Kenworthy's Friend
 All the Right Noises (1971) as Waitress

References

External links
 

Living people
English female models
The Rolling Stones
Actresses from London
Mick Jagger
1945 births